A lieutenant (abbreviated Lt., Lt, LT, Lieut and similar) is a commissioned officer rank in the armed forces of many nations.

The meaning of lieutenant differs in different militaries (see comparative military ranks), but it is often subdivided into senior (first lieutenant) and junior (second lieutenant and even third lieutenant) ranks. In navies, it is often equivalent to the army rank of captain; it may also indicate a particular post rather than a rank. The rank is also used in fire services, emergency medical services, security services and police forces.

Lieutenant may also appear as part of a title used in various other organisations with a codified command structure. It often designates someone who is "second-in-command", and as such, may precede the name of the rank directly above it. For example, a "lieutenant master" is likely to be second-in-command to the "master" in an organisation using both ranks.

Political uses include lieutenant governor in various governments, such as the viceregal representatives of the Crown in Canadian provinces. In the United Kingdom, a lord lieutenant is the sovereign's representative in a county or lieutenancy area, while a deputy lieutenant is one of the lord lieutenant's deputies.

Etymology
The word lieutenant derives from French; the lieu meaning "place" as in a position (cf. in lieu of); and tenant meaning "holding" as in "holding a position"; thus a "lieutenant" is a placeholder for a superior, during their absence (compare the Latin locum tenens).

In the 19th century, British writers who considered this word either an imposition on the English language, or difficult for common soldiers and sailors, argued for it to be replaced by the calque "steadholder". However, their efforts failed, and the French word is still used, along with its many variations (e.g. lieutenant colonel, lieutenant general, lieutenant commander, flight lieutenant, second lieutenant and many non-English language examples), in both the Old and the New World.

Pronunciation
The early history of the pronunciation is unclear; Middle English spellings suggest that both pronunciations may have existed even then. The majority of sixteenth- and seventeenth-century sources show pronunciations with /v/ or /f/, but Bullokar has /liu/.

Furthermore, in Latin, the lingua franca of the era, the letter v is used for both u and v.
In Royal Naval (RN) tradition—and other English-speaking navies outside the United States—a reduced pronunciation  is used. This is not recognised as current by recent editions of the OED (although the RN pronunciation was included in editions of OED up until the 1970s).

Military rank

Lieutenant
The senior grade of lieutenant is known as first lieutenant in the United States, and as lieutenant in the United Kingdom and the rest of the English-speaking world. In countries that do not speak English, the rank title usually translates as "lieutenant", but may also translate as "first lieutenant" or "senior lieutenant". The Israel Defense Forces rank segen (סגן) literally translates as "deputy", which is equivalent to a lieutenant. In the Finnish military there is a senior lieutenant grade that ranks above lieutenant and second lieutenant but below captain; it does not have an English equivalent. In Germany it is called Oberleutnant (senior lieutenant).

Army rank
Conventionally, armies and other services or branches that use army-style rank titles have two grades of lieutenant, but a few also use a third, more junior, rank. Historically, the "lieutenant" was the deputy to a "captain", and as the rank structure of armies began to formalise, this came to mean that a captain commanded a company and had several lieutenants, each commanding a platoon. Where more junior officers were employed as deputies to the lieutenant, they went by many names, including second lieutenant, sub-lieutenant, ensign and cornet. Some parts of the British Army, including the Royal Artillery, Royal Engineers and fusilier regiments, used first lieutenant as well as second lieutenant until the end of the 19th century, and some British Army regiments still preserve cornet as an official alternative to second lieutenant.

There is great variation in the insignia used worldwide. In most English-speaking and Arabic-speaking countries, as well as a number of European and South American nations, full lieutenants (and equivalents) usually wear two stars (pips) and second lieutenants (and equivalents) one. An example of an exception is the United States, whose armed forces distinguish their lieutenant ranks with a silver bar for first lieutenant and brass bar for second lieutenant.

Marine rank
The United States Marine Corps and British Royal Marines both use army ranks, while many former Eastern-Bloc marine forces retain the naval form. Before 1999 the Royal Marines enjoyed the same rank structure as the army, but at a grade higher; thus a Royal Marine captain ranked with and was paid the same as a British Army major. This historical remnant caused increasing confusion in multi-national operations and was abolished.

Air force rank

While some air forces use the army rank system, the British Royal Air Force and many other Commonwealth air forces use another rank system in which flight lieutenant ranks with an army captain and naval lieutenant, a flying officer ranks with an army lieutenant and a pilot officer with an army second lieutenant.

In the US Air Force, the Third Lieutenant Program refers specifically to a training program at active duty air force bases for cadets of the Air Force Academy and Air Force ROTC the summer before their fourth and final year before graduation and commissioning. A single silver or subdued pip is used to designate this rank.

The Royal Air Force also has an acting pilot officer designation, the most junior commissioned rank in the British armed forces. It is functionally equivalent to third lieutenant.

Naval rank

During the early days of the naval rank, a lieutenant might be very junior indeed, or might be on the cusp of promotion to captain; by modern standards, he might rank with any army rank between second lieutenant and lieutenant colonel. As the rank structure of navies stabilized, and the ranks of commander, lieutenant commander and sub-lieutenant were introduced, the naval lieutenant came to rank with an army captain (NATO OF-2 or US O-3).

The insignia of a lieutenant in many navies, including the Royal Navy, consists of two medium gold braid stripes (top stripe with loop) on a navy blue or black background. This pattern was copied by the United States Navy and various Air Forces for their equivalent ranks grades, except that the loop is removed (see flight lieutenant).

Lieutenant commander

Lieutenants were commonly put in command of smaller vessels not warranting a commander or captain: such a lieutenant was called a "lieutenant commanding" or "lieutenant commandant" in the United States Navy, and a "lieutenant in command" or "lieutenant and commander" in the Royal Navy. The USN settled on "lieutenant commander" in 1862, and made it a distinct rank; the Royal Navy followed suit in March 1914. The insignia of an additional half-thickness stripe between the two full stripes of a lieutenant was introduced in 1877 for a Royal Navy lieutenant of 8 years seniority, and used for lieutenant commanders upon introduction of their rank.

Senior lieutenant

First lieutenant

"First lieutenant" in naval use
The first lieutenant in the Royal Navy and other Commonwealth navies, is a post or appointment, rather than a rank. Historically the lieutenants in a ship were ranked in accordance with seniority, with the most senior being termed the "first lieutenant" and acting as the second-in-command. Although lieutenants are no longer numbered by seniority, the post of "first lieutenant" remains. In minor war vessels, destroyers and frigates the first lieutenant (either a lieutenant or lieutenant-commander) is second in command, executive officer (XO) and head of the executive branch; in larger ships where a commander of the warfare specialization is appointed as the executive officer, a first lieutenant (normally a lieutenant-commander) is appointed as his deputy. The post of first lieutenant in a shore establishment carries a similar responsibility to the first lieutenant of a capital ship.

In the U.S. Navy or U.S. Coast Guard the billet of first lieutenant describes the officer in charge of the deck department or division, depending upon the size of the ship. In smaller ships with only a single deck division, the billet is typically filled by an ensign while in larger ships with a deck department, consisting of multiple subordinate divisions, the billet may be filled by a lieutenant commander. On submarines and smaller Coast Guard cutters the billet of first lieutenant may be filled by a petty officer.

Second lieutenant

Second lieutenant is usually the most junior grade of commissioned officer. In most cases, newly commissioned officers do not remain at the rank for long before being promoted, and both university graduates and officers commissioned from the ranks may skip the rank altogether.

Third lieutenant

United States rank
In March 1813, the US Army created the rank of third lieutenant. The rank was used as the entry level officer rank for the Ordnance Department and the Corps of Artillery until March 1821. Throughout the 19th century and until as late as World War II the United States Army sometimes referred to brevet second lieutenants as "third lieutenants". These were typically newly commissioned officers for which no authorized second lieutenant position existed. Additionally, the Confederate States Army also used "third lieutenant", typically as the lowest ranking commissioned officer in an infantry company.

Notably, the United States Revenue Cutter Service used a simple officer rank structure with Captain, First, Second and Third Lieutenants, each of whom had distinct insignia. The title of Third Lieutenant, essentially equal to the rank of ensign, existed until 1915 when the Service became the nucleus of the new United States Coast Guard. Because of the time required to fully establish this organization the rank continued for some time afterwards; the first Coast Guard aviator, Elmer F. Stone, was a third lieutenant until 1918.

Sub-lieutenant

In the Royal Navy, the commissioned rank of mate was created in 1840, and was renamed sub-lieutenant in 1860. In the US Navy, the rank was called master until 1883, when it was renamed lieutenant, junior grade. In many navies, a sub-lieutenant is a naval commissioned or subordinate officer, ranking below a lieutenant, but in Brazil it is the highest non-commissioned rank, and in Spain it is the second highest non-commissioned rank. In Portugal, sub-lieutenant is the rank of a junior naval officer graduated from a civil university or promoted from a NCO rank, while the equivalent rank of an officer graduated in the naval academy is designated midshipman.

Other uses

Police rank

France and the French Union
The first French Lieutenant of Police, Gabriel Nicolas de la Reynie, was appointed in Paris by Louis XIV on 15 March 1667 to command a reformed police force. He was later elevated to Lieutenant-General of Police. In the 17th century, the term "lieutenant" corresponded to "deputy" (i.e. a person appointed to carry out a task). La Reynie was the deputy for policing duties of the Provost of Paris, the ceremonial representative of the King in Paris. In 1995, the rank of lieutenant was introduced in the National Police as the first rank of the police officers scale.

United Kingdom and Commonwealth police forces
The rank of Lieutenant was formerly used in areas outside of the Metropolitan Police. The adoption of standardized ranks across the United Kingdom has eliminated its use. A number of city and burgh police forces in Scotland used the rank of lieutenant (and detective lieutenant) between inspector and superintendent from 1812 to 1948. It was replaced by the rank of chief inspector. The Royal Newfoundland Constabulary (founded 1871) had the rank of lieutenant between staff sergeant and inspector until 1997. In Australia, Queensland's first police force (founded 1864) had second lieutenants and lieutenants between the ranks of sergeant and inspector-general.

United States police forces
The rank of police lieutenant is used in most medium or large police departments in the United States, where it is one rank above sergeant and two ranks above a regular police officer (three in departments with a corporal rank). It is roughly equivalent to an inspector in the British and Canadian police forces. The usual role of a lieutenant is to carry out administrative duties and assist precinct commanders (normally a Captain, or sometimes the local police chiefs). In smaller police departments, they may command a precinct itself. Lieutenants either command a watch (8-hour "shift") of regular officers or a special unit for operations or investigations (like a Robbery-Homicide squad). The typical rank insignia for a lieutenant is a single silver bar (like that of an Army or Marine Corps First Lieutenant) or a single gold bar (like that of an Army or Marine Corps Second Lieutenant). Some police departments split the rank of lieutenant into two separate grades.

Other nations

Fire services rank

Singapore 
In the Singapore Civil Defence Force, the rank of lieutenant (LTA) is the second-lowest commissioned rank. The rank insignia of LTA is two pips.

Political titles

Canada
In Canada, the representative of the Canadian monarch in each province is called the Lieutenant Governor. The Lieutenant Governor exercises all the royal prerogative powers that the monarch holds.

France
In French history, "lieutenant du roi" was a title borne by the officer sent with military powers to represent the king in certain provinces. It is in the sense of a deputy that it has entered into the titles of more senior officers, lieutenant general and lieutenant colonel.

United Kingdom
The British monarch's representatives in the counties of the United Kingdom are called Lords Lieutenant. The Lord Lieutenant of Ireland performed the function of viceroy in Ireland.

United States
The Lieutenant Governor is an official in state governments of 45 out of 50 United States.  In most cases, the lieutenant governor is the highest officer of state after the governor, standing in for the governor when they are absent from the state or temporarily incapacitated. In the event a governor dies, resigns, or is removed from office, the lieutenant governor typically becomes governor.

In the United States, a governor serves as the chief executive officer and commander-in-chief in each of the fifty states and in the five permanently inhabited territories, functioning as both head of state and head of government therein.

Other organisations

The Boys' Brigade 
Leaders, or officers of the Boys' Brigade, particularly in the United Kingdom, are ranked as lieutenants after having completed their formal training, before which they are ranked as warrant officers. Officers serving in staff or command posts are awarded the "brevet" rank of captain, these officers then revert to their lieutenancy after having completed their tour of duty.

National Civil Defence Cadet Corps 
The rank of cadet lieutenant (CLT) is given to officer cadet trainees who have passed their officer's course. The rank insignia of CLT is a pip and a bar below it. CLTs may be promoted to the rank of senior cadet lieutenant (S/CLT), which has a rank insignia of a pip and two bars below it.

The Salvation Army 
The Salvation Army also uses lieutenant to denote first time officers, or clergymen/women.

See also
Captain lieutenant
Military rank
Comparative military ranks
Tenentism

References

External links 
 

Military ranks
Naval ranks
Police ranks
Military ranks of the Nepali Army